"She Said She Said" is a song by the English rock band the Beatles from their 1966 album Revolver. Credited to Lennon–McCartney, it was written by John Lennon with assistance from George Harrison. Lennon described it as "an 'acidy' song" with lyrics inspired by actor Peter Fonda's comments during an LSD trip in August 1965 with members of the Beatles and the Byrds. "She Said She Said" was the last track recorded for Revolver. Due to an argument over the song's musical arrangement, Paul McCartney walked out of the studio during the song's recording.

Background and inspiration

In late August 1965, Brian Epstein had rented a house at 2850 Benedict Canyon Drive in Beverly Hills, California for the Beatles' six-day respite from their US tour. The large Spanish-style house was hidden within the side of a mountain. Soon their address became widely known and the area was besieged by fans, who blocked roads and tried to scale the steep canyon while others rented helicopters to spy from overhead. The police department detailed a tactical squad of officers to protect the band and the house. The Beatles found it impossible to leave and instead invited guests, including actress Eleanor Bron (their co-star in the film Help!) and folk singer Joan Baez. On 24 August, they hosted Roger McGuinn and David Crosby of the Byrds and actor Peter Fonda.

Having first taken LSD (or "acid") in March that year, John Lennon and George Harrison were determined that Paul McCartney and Ringo Starr should join them on their next experience of the drug. Harrison later said that the heightened perception induced by LSD had been so powerful that he and Lennon had not been able to "relate" to McCartney and Starr since then, adding: "Not just on the one level – we couldn't relate to them on any level, because acid had changed us so much." At the party, the issue of taking LSD thereby became important to maintain band unity. While Starr agreed to try the drug, McCartney refused to partake.

Fonda wrote for Rolling Stone magazine:

As the group passed time in the large sunken tub in the bathroom, Fonda brought up his nearly fatal self-inflicted childhood gunshot accident, writing later that he was trying to comfort Harrison, who was overcome by fear that he might be dying. Fonda said that he knew what it was like to be dead, since he had technically died in the operating theatre. Lennon urged him to drop the subject, saying "Who put all that shit in your head?" and "You're making me feel like I've never been born." Harrison recalls in The Beatles Anthology: "[Fonda] was showing us his bullet wound. He was very uncool." Lennon explained in a 1980 interview:

Lennon eventually asked Fonda to leave the party. After this, the gathering settled down as Lennon, Harrison, McGuinn and Crosby sat in the large bathtub discussing their shared interest in Indian classical music. Crosby demonstrated raga scales on an acoustic guitar and recommended that Harrison investigate the recordings of Indian sitarist Ravi Shankar. Peter Brown, Epstein's assistant, later wrote that, in addition to inspiring Lennon's 1966 song "She Said She Said", the band members' "LSD experiment" in August 1965 "marked the unheralded beginning of a new era for the Beatles". Author George Case, writing in his book Out of Our Heads, describes the Beatles' subsequent album, Rubber Soul, and its 1966 follow-up, Revolver, as "the authentic beginning of the psychedelic era".

Composition
Lennon began working on "She Said She Said" in March 1966, shortly before the Beatles started recording Revolver. On the home recordings he made at this time, the song was titled "He Said" and performed on acoustic guitar. Lennon said that the episode with Fonda had stuck with him, and when writing the song, "I changed it to 'she' instead of 'he.'" Harrison recalled helping Lennon construct the song from "maybe three" separate segments that Lennon had. Harrison described the process as "a real weld". In his 2017 book Who Wrote the Beatle Songs?, author Todd Compton credits Lennon and Harrison as the song's true composers.

"She Said She Said" is in the key of B Mixolydian, based on three chords: B (I), A (VII), and E (IV). The key centre shifts to E major during the bridge sections by means of an F minor (v) chord, a pivot chord that the Beatles had used to modulate to the subdominant before on "From Me to You" and "I Want to Hold Your Hand". The coda features a canonic imitation in the voice parts, a development of the idea originally presented by Harrison's lead guitar in the verse. Lennon's Hammond organ part consists entirely of one note – a tonic B-flat held throughout and faded in and out.

The track incorporates a change of metre, following Harrison's introduction of such a musical device into the Beatles' work with his Indian-styled composition "Love You To". "She Said She Said" uses both 3/4 and 4/4 time, shifting to 3/4 on the line "No, no, no, you're wrong" and back again on "I said …" The middle part consists of another song fragment that Lennon had penned. At Harrison's suggestion, Lennon used this fragment in the middle of "She Said She Said". In this section, the subject of Lennon's lyrics changes from his recollection of the LSD episode with Fonda to a reminiscence of childhood, as Lennon sings: "When I was a boy everything was right / Everything was right". According to musicologist Walter Everett, this abstraction is Lennon's refuge from the disturbing sensation that he's "never been born", and the change in time signature to 3/4 serves as an appropriate device for the shift in lyrical focus back in time. Musicologist Alan Pollack comments that, typically of the Beatles' work, the song's experimental qualities – rhythm, meter, lyrics, and sound treatment on the official recording – are tempered effectively by the band's adherence to a recognisable musical form. In this case, the structure comprises two verses, two bridge sections separated by a single verse, followed by a final verse and an outro (or coda).

In his commentary on "She Said She Said", music critic Tim Riley writes that the song conveys the "primal urge" for innocence, which imbues the lyric with "complexity", as the speaker suffers through feelings of "inadequacy", "helplessness" and "profound fear". In Riley's opinion, the track's "intensity is palpable" and "the music is a direct connection to [Lennon's] psyche"; he adds that "at the core of Lennon's pain is a bottomless sense of abandonment", a theme that the singer would return to in late 1966 with "Strawberry Fields Forever".

Recording
"She Said She Said" was the final track recorded during the Revolver sessions. It was also the first composition that Lennon had brought to the band in almost two months, since "I'm Only Sleeping". Because of Lennon's lack of productivity, Harrison was afforded a rare opportunity to have a third song, "I Want to Tell You", included on a Beatles album. The session took place on 21 June 1966, two days before the Beatles had to leave for West Germany to begin the first leg of their 1966 world tour. It took nine hours to rehearse and record, complete with overdubs, making it the only song on Revolver to be made in a single session. After the subsequent mixing session, the Beatles' producer, George Martin, said: "All right, boys, I'm just going for a lie-down."

The creative cooperation among the four Beatles was at its highest during the Revolver period. There nevertheless remained a philosophical divide between McCartney and Lennon, Harrison and Starr due to McCartney's refusal to try LSD. McCartney took part in the early takes for "She Said She Said" but did not contribute to the finished recording. He recalled: "I think we had a barney or something and I said, 'Oh, fuck you!,' and they said, 'Well, we'll do it.' I think George played bass." Harrison played a Burns bass guitar, which he had used earlier in the Revolver sessions, during initial recording for "Paperback Writer". Harrison also contributed the lead guitar part, incorporating an Indian quality in its sound and providing an introduction that Riley describes as "outwardly harnessed, but inwardly raging". Case describes the recording as "a metallic spiral of guitar and drums as aggressive as anything by the Who or the Yardbirds".

According to McCartney biographer Barry Miles, logs from the recording session appear to contradict McCartney's statement, as they do not indicate any bass overdubs by Harrison. Some authors therefore state that McCartney taped a bass track before walking out, on the same track as Starr's drums. In his 2012 book on the making of Revolver, however, Robert Rodriguez comments that the stereo mix of the song puts the bass and drums on separate channels – showing that the two contributions were not recorded together on the same track, which the logs suggest – and the bass part has little in common with McCartney's playing style or sound. He concludes that the session logs must be wrong and Harrison's role as bassist on "She Said She Said" is "pretty well certain".

In his liner notes to the 2022 Revolver: Special Edition, archivist Kevin Howlett states that "It is pretty certain... that Paul is heard on the original rhythm track containing bass and drums". He instead suspects that the argument related to a disagreement over the song's arrangement during the overdubbing process, adding that a recording sheet for the session indicates that a piano contribution was included on the song before being wiped from the tapes entirely.

Rodriguez highlights McCartney's walkout as one of "a handful of unsolved Beatles mysteries". When identifying the probable causes for McCartney's uncharacteristic behaviour, he cites later comments made by Lennon: specifically that Lennon appreciated Harrison's tendency to "take it as-is" whereas McCartney often took a musical arrangement in a direction he himself preferred; and that, given Lennon and Harrison's habit of teasing their bandmate over his refusal to take LSD, McCartney possibly felt alienated by the song's subject matter. Lennon expressed satisfaction with the completed track, adding, "The guitars are great on it."

Release and reception
EMI's Parlophone label released Revolver on 5 August 1966, one week before the Beatles began their final North American tour. "She Said She Said" was sequenced as the last track on side one of the LP, following "Yellow Submarine". Actress Salli Sachse, who appeared with Fonda in the 1967 film The Trip, recalled of his reaction to the release: "Peter was really into music. He couldn't wait until The Beatles' Revolver album came out. We went to the music store and played it, trying to hear any hidden messages." Writing in 2017, Alec Wilkinson of The New Yorker said that "She Said She Said" introduced "circumstances novel to western awareness", a theme that had "no obvious antecedent or reference" in pop music. As with much of the album, the song confused many of the band's younger or less-progressive fans. According to sociologist Candy Leonard: "For two and a half minutes they heard John recounting an impassioned conversation about something that seemed very important but totally incomprehensible. And the echoing guitar riff is a full participant in the conversation. Fans were bewildered."

The song was an early example of acid rock, a genre that came to the fore in Britain and America in the wake of Revolver. In his book on the Swinging London phenomenon, Shawn Levy identifies the album's "trio of tuned-in, blissed-out, spiked and spaced tunes" by Lennon – "Tomorrow Never Knows", "She Said She Said" and "I'm Only Sleeping" – as especially indicative of the Beatles' transformation into "the world's first household psychedelics, avatars of something wilder and more revolutionary than anything pop culture had ever delivered before". Rolling Stone attributes the development of the Los Angeles and San Francisco music scenes, including subsequent releases by the Beach Boys, Love and the Grateful Dead, to the influence of Revolver, particularly the "conjunction of melodic immediacy and acid-fueled mind games" in "She Said She Said". The song was much admired by American composer and conductor Leonard Bernstein. In his 1967 television special Inside Pop: The Rock Revolution, he described it as a "remarkable song" and demonstrated its shift in time signature as an example of the Beatles' talent for inventive and unexpected musical devices in their work.

Starr's drumming on "She Said She Said" is often included among his best performances. Author and critic Ian MacDonald rated the drumming as "technically finer than that of [Starr's] other tour-de-force, 'Rain'". In 1988, home recordings of Lennon developing the song were broadcast on the Westwood One radio show The Lost Lennon Tapes. A cassette containing 25 minutes of these recordings, which Lennon had given to Tony Cox, the former husband of his second wife, Yoko Ono, in January 1970, was auctioned at Christie's in London in April 2002.

"She Said She Said" was included on the Beatles' 2012 iTunes compilation Tomorrow Never Knows, which the band's website described as a collection of "the Beatles' most influential rock songs". It has been covered by the following acts, among others: Lone Star, Ween, the Black Keys, Matthew Sweet, Gov't Mule, the Feelies, Tom Newman, the Chords, Snake River Conspiracy, Mark Mulcahy, the Walking Seeds and Yeah Yeah Noh. Cheap Trick performed it as part of The Howard Stern Shows tribute to Revolver in 2016. In 2018, the music staff of Time Out London ranked "She Said She Said" at number 19 on their list of the best Beatles songs.

Personnel
According to Ian MacDonald, Walter Everett and Robert Rodriguez:

 John Lennon – lead and backing vocals, rhythm guitar, Hammond organ
 George Harrison – backing vocal, bass guitar, lead guitar
 Ringo Starr – drums, shaker

Kevin Howlett and John C. Winn write that McCartney played bass on the rhythm track before leaving the studio. According to Howlett and Winn, the line-up is as follows:

 John Lennon – lead and harmony vocals, rhythm guitar, Hammond organ
 Paul McCartney – bass guitar
 George Harrison – harmony vocal, lead guitar
 Ringo Starr – drums

Notes

References

Sources

External links
 Full lyrics for the song at the Beatles' official website
Handwritten partial draft manuscript of She Said She Said by John Lennon at the British Library

1966 songs
The Beatles songs
Songs written by Lennon–McCartney
Song recordings produced by George Martin
Songs published by Northern Songs
Songs about drugs
British psychedelic rock songs
Acid rock songs
Ween songs